The 29th Annual Screen Actors Guild Awards, honoring the best achievements in film and television performances for the year 2022, were presented on February 26, 2023 at the Fairmont Century Plaza in Century City, California. The ceremony streamed live on Netflix's YouTube channel, starting at 8:00 p.m. EST / 5:00 p.m. PST. The nominees were announced on January 11, 2023 by Ashley Park and Haley Lu Richardson via Instagram Live.

In May 2022, it was confirmed that the ceremony would no longer air on TNT and TBS (the ceremony had aired on TNT since 1998 and had been also broadcast on TBS since 2006); a spokesperson insisted that finding a new home for the ceremony "is not unusual and has occurred several times over the history of the SAG Awards. This is no different". The day of the nominations announcement, it was confirmed that the ceremony would stream live on Netflix's YouTube channel.

The Banshees of Inisherin and Everything Everywhere All at Once both received five nominations, tying the record for the most nominations in SAG Awards history with Shakespeare in Love (1998), Chicago (2002), and Doubt (2008).

Everything Everywhere All at Once ultimately won the most awards of the ceremony with four wins, the most for any film in SAG Awards history, with Michelle Yeoh and Ke Huy Quan both becoming the first Asian actors to win in individual categories: Outstanding Performance by a Female Actor in a Leading Role and Outstanding Performance by a Male Actor in a Supporting Role, respectively.

Sally Field was announced as the 2022 SAG Life Achievement Award recipient on January 17, 2023.

Winners and nominees
 Note: Winners are listed first and highlighted in boldface.

Film

Television

Screen Actors Guild Life Achievement Award
 Sally Field

In Memoriam
The segment, introduced by Don Cheadle, honored the following who died in 2022 and early 2023:

 Leslie Jordan
 Louise Fletcher
 David Warner
 Liz Sheridan
 Irene Cara
 Ray Liotta
 Paul Sorvino
 Cindy Williams
 William Hurt
 Lisa Loring
 Fred Ward
 Kathryn Hays
 Tony Dow
 Marsha Hunt
 L. Q. Jones
 Annie Wersching
 Tim Considine
 Ralph Ahn
 Rebecca Balding
 F.J. O'Neil
 Mitchell Ryan
 Bo Hopkins
 Yoshio Yoda
 Sandra Seacat
 Clu Gulager
 Andrew Prine
 Lance Kerwin
 Stella Stevens
 Charles Kimbrough
 Robert Morse
 Gina Lollobrigida
 Roger E. Mosley
 Ned Eisenberg
 Nehemiah Persoff
 Philip Baker Hall
 Melinda Dillon
 David Birney
 Larry Storch
 Henry Silva
 Bruce MacVittie
 John Aylward
 Bob McGrath
 Emilio Delgado
 Anne Heche
 Tony Sirico
 John Aniston
 Nichelle Nichols
 Lenny Von Dohlen
 Ron Masak
 Conrad Janis
 Ted White
 Mark Miller
 Clarence Gilyard Jr.
 Barbara Bosson
 Adam Rich
 Gregory Itzin
 Eileen Ryan
 Austin Majors
 Cody Longo
 Olivia Newton-John
 Kevin Conroy
 Pat Carroll
 Gilbert Gottfried
 Estelle Harris
 Stuart Margolin
 Raquel Welch
 Robbie Coltrane
 Richard Belzer
 Kirstie Alley
 Mary Alice
 James Caan
 Angela Lansbury

Presenters
The awards and segments were presented by the following individuals:

References

External links
 

2022
2023 in Los Angeles
Screen
2022 in American cinema
2022 in American television
Screen
2023 awards in the United States
February 2023 events in the United States